This is a list of cathedrals in the United States, including both actual cathedrals (seats of bishops in episcopal Christian groups, such as Catholicism, Anglicanism, Eastern Orthodoxy and the Armenian Apostolic Church) and a few prominent churches from non-episcopal denominations that have the word "cathedral" in their names.

The United States is, according to some measures, home to the largest cathedral in the world: the Cathedral of St. John the Divine (Episcopal) in New York City.

Alabama

Alaska

Arizona

Arkansas

California

Colorado

Connecticut

Delaware

District of Columbia

Florida

Georgia

Hawaii

Idaho

Illinois

Indiana

Iowa

Kansas

Kentucky

Louisiana

Maine

Maryland

Massachusetts

Michigan

Minnesota

Mississippi

Missouri

Montana

Nebraska

Nevada

New Hampshire

New Jersey

New Mexico

New York

North Carolina

North Dakota

Ohio

Oklahoma

Oregon

Pennsylvania

Rhode Island

South Carolina

South Dakota

Tennessee

Texas

Utah

Vermont

Virginia

Washington

West Virginia

Wisconsin

Wyoming

United States territories

American Samoa

Guam

Northern Mariana Islands

Puerto Rico

U.S. Virgin Islands

'Cathedrals' without an episcopal function
West Angeles Cathedral (Pentecostal) in Los Angeles, California
Cathedral of Promise (Metropolitan Community Church) Sacramento, California
The First Cathedral, "A Church for all people" in Bloomfield, Connecticut (Non-Denominational)
Sunshine Cathedral, in Fort Lauderdale (Metropolitan Community Church)
Cathedral of the Rockies, in Boise (United Methodist)
Greater Allen A. M. E. Cathedral of New York(Jamaica, Queens) (African Methodist Episcopal)
Cathedral of the Air in Lakehurst
Cathedral of Hope (United Church of Christ)
Cathedral of Hope, in Pittsburgh (Presbyterian)
Christ Cathedral (Fayetteville, North Carolina) (non-denominational)
Mount Olive Cathedral, in Memphis, Tennessee (Christian Methodist Episcopal)
SunCoast Cathedral, Venice, Florida
The Cathedral at Greater Faith (Pentecostal), in Bronx, New York

See also
List of cathedrals
List of the Catholic cathedrals of the United States
Dioceses of the Episcopal Church in the United States of America
List of Coptic Orthodox Churches in the United States
List of largest church buildings in the world
List of basilicas

References

 
Cathedrals in United States
United States
Cathedrals